Wharfedale is the valley of the upper parts of the River Wharfe and one of the Yorkshire Dales. It is situated within the districts  of Craven and Harrogate in North Yorkshire, and the cities of Leeds and Bradford in West Yorkshire. It is the upper valley of the River Wharfe. Towns and villages in Wharfedale (downstream, from west to east) include Buckden, Kettlewell, Conistone, Grassington, Hebden, Bolton Abbey, Addingham, Ilkley, Burley-in-Wharfedale, Otley, Pool-in-Wharfedale, Arthington, Collingham and Wetherby. Beyond Wetherby, the valley opens out and becomes part of the Vale of York.

The section from the river's source to around Addingham is known as Upper Wharfedale and lies in North Yorkshire and in the Yorkshire Dales National Park. The first  or so is known as Langstrothdale, including the settlements of Beckermonds, Yockenthwaite and Hubberholme, famous for its church, the resting place of the writer J. B. Priestley. As it turns southwards, the Wharfe then runs through a green and lush valley, with limestone outcrops, such as Kilnsey Crag, and woodland, generally quite unusual in the Dales.

Below Addingham, the dale broadens and turns to the east. This section is shared between North Yorkshire and West Yorkshire and includes the towns of Ilkley, Otley and Wetherby. The northern side of Lower Wharfedale, opposite Ilkley, Burley-in-Wharfedale and Otley, is in the Nidderdale Area of Outstanding Natural Beauty.

The Yorkshire Dales Rivers Trust has a remit to conserve the ecological condition of Wharfedale, Wensleydale, Swaledale and Nidderdale catchments from their headwaters to the Humber Estuary.

History

The Wharfedale valley was cut into the shape we know today during the last ice age (the Devensian Glaciation). The valley was transformed into its classic U-shaped state between 18,000 and 12,000 years ago by the Wharfedale Glacier, though this was cutting through a channel that had already had a river draining water away to the east through what is now Wharfedale, and also to the north through what is now Bishopdale and then Wensleydale. 

Evidence of human settlement has been found dating back to Neolithic times and the valley has plenty of artefacts relating to the Celtic, Roman and Anglo-Saxon periods. The Romans built a road over Stake Moss into what is now the village of Bainbridge in Wensleydale. 

The Anglo-Saxon influence remains in modern times, with most settlements in Upper Wharfedale having Anglo-Saxon derived names.

The name of the valley is derived from the principal river that flows through it: the Wharfe, which comes from the Old English Weorf or Old Norse Hverfr, with both taken as meaning winding river. The valley roughly follows a south-easterly direction, providing a border between West Yorkshire (on the south side) and North Yorkshire. 

The uppermost part of the valley is known as Langstrothdale. Below Beckermonds the river is known as the River Wharfe. Wetherby is traditionally seen as the foot of Wharfedale, even though the river continues on through the Vale of York.

The valley has been used largely for agriculture, and is now criss-crossed with stone walls and stone barns that evidence its use down the centuries.

Geology
The geology of the valley is split, with Upper Wharfedale consisting of carboniferous limestone of the Yoredale series. In the lower part of Wharfedale, around Ilkley and Otley, the underlying stone is mostly millstone grit, which can be seen best at the Cow and Calf rocks on the south side of the valley on Ilkley Moor. The Bramley Almanac for 1931 lists 'Earthquake in Wharfedale' for 15th December 1859

Wharfedale Ward
As an electoral subdivision Wharfedale is a ward in the north east of the City of Bradford metropolitan borough. It consists of the settlements of Burley-in-Wharfedale, Burley Woodhead and Menston along with surrounding moorland. The population of the ward taken at the 2011 Census was 11,836.

Deanery of South Craven and Wharfedale

In 2017, in consideration of regional geography, the Church of England changed its subdivisions and re-grouped the Deanery of Wharfedale with that of South Craven, in order that the similar regions can work together more effectively.

Wharfedale in culture

One of the most renowned painters of the Victorian era, John Atkinson Grimshaw, portrayed the area in his piece, "Moonlight, Wharfedale" (1871 – oil on card ). He is known as one of the best and most accomplished nightscape and townscape artists of all time, and this painting is a prime example of his mastery. J. M. W. Turner also visited and painted scenes around Otley and Ilkley. Turner was commissioned to paint Kilnsey Crag, which he created as an oil painting in 1816.

The valley was featured in episode three of the BBC Two series, The Yorkshire Dales.

References

External links

 Upper Wharfedale School Website
 Kilnsey Crag by JMW Turner

 
Valleys of North Yorkshire
Valleys of West Yorkshire
River Wharfe